Bhore Assembly constituency is an assembly constituency in Gopalganj district in the Indian state of Bihar. It is reserved for scheduled castes.

History
It is believed that Bhore is named on the name of a King Bhurishrava who reigned on this land in Dvapara Yuga (The Age of Krishna). He fought in the great Kurukshetr War in support of Kaurava. He got boon for a magical Elephant which could travel from Bhore to Kurukshetra within one day.

Overview
As per Delimitation of Parliamentary and Assembly constituencies Order, 2008, No. 103 Bhore Assembly constituency (SC) is composed of the following: Bhore, Kateya and vijaipur community development blocks.

Bhore Assembly constituency is part of No. 17 Gopalganj (Lok Sabha constituency) (SC).

Members of Legislative Assembly

2020 election results

References

External links
 

Assembly constituencies of Bihar
Politics of Gopalganj district, India